Teamwork is an Irish, privately owned, web-based software company headquartered in Cork, Ireland. Teamwork creates task management and team collaboration software. Founded in 2007, as of 2016 the company stated that its software was in use by over 370,000 organisations worldwide (including Disney, Spotify and HP), and that it had over 2.4m users.

Company history

Peter Coppinger and Dan Mackey founded a company, Digital Crew, in 2007. This company built websites, intranets and custom web-based solutions for clients in Cork, Ireland. Frustrated by whiteboards and software management tools, Coppinger wanted a software system that would help manage client projects and which would be easy-to-use and generic enough to be used by different types of companies. Originally 37signals Basecamp users themselves, Coppinger and Mackey were frustrated by the limited feature set and by Basecamp's apparent inaction on their feedback. In October 2007, Coppinger and Mackey launched Teamwork Project Manager, nicknamed TeamworkPM. In March 2015, this was renamed as Teamwork Projects.

In 2014, after two years of negotiations, TeamworkPM bought the domain name 'Teamwork.com' for US$675,000 (€500,000). At the time this was one of the most expensive domain name purchases by an Irish company, and involved the transfer of a domain name which had been dormant since it was first acquired by the original owner in 1999.

In 2015, Teamwork was named by Gartner to be one of their "Cool Vendors" in the Program and Portfolio Management Category. This was followed by the launch of a new real-time messaging product, Teamwork Chat, in January 2015. In June 2015, the company announced a drive to recruit for 40 positions by the end of the year. This was followed by the announcement that the company was investing more than €1 million in a new office, and had leased office space in Park House, Blackpool. 

In June 2016, Teamwork undertook a further recruitment drive to entice developers to Cork.

In July 2021, the company announced has raised an investment of $70 million (€59.1 million) from venture capital firm Bregal Milestone to fund further growth.

Products

Teamwork markets a number of cloud-based applications, including Teamwork, Teamwork Desk, Teamwork Spaces, Teamwork CRM and Teamwork Chat. Teamwork was launched on 4 October 2007, at which time it had time management, milestone management, file sharing, time tracking, and messaging features.

Teamwork's platform reportedly integrates with martech software like HubSpot, as well as other productivity tools like Slack, G Suite, MS Teams, Zapier, Dropbox and QuickBooks.

Awards
In 2016, Teamwork was awarded Cork's Best SME in the Cork Chamber of Commerce "Company of the Year" awards.
In 2016, Teamwork was named number 7 in Deloitte's Fast 50 tech companies hit €1.6bn turnover.
In 2015, Teamwork was identified as a Gartner "Cool Vendor" in the Program and Portfolio Mangagement Category.

See also 

List of collaborative software
List of project management software

References

External links

Project management software
Task management software
Web applications
Collaborative software
Groupware
Software project management
Document management systems